The beta-1 adrenergic receptor (β1 adrenoceptor), also known as ADRB1, is a beta-adrenergic receptor, and also denotes the human gene encoding it. It is a G-protein coupled receptor associated with the Gs heterotrimeric G-protein and is expressed predominantly in cardiac tissue.

Receptor

Actions
Actions of the β1 receptor include:

The receptor is also present in the cerebral cortex.

Agonists
Isoprenaline has higher affinity for β1 than adrenaline, which, in turn, binds with higher affinity than noradrenaline at physiologic concentrations. 
Selective agonists to the beta-1 receptor are:
Denopamine
Dobutamine (in cardiogenic shock)
Xamoterol (cardiac stimulant)

Antagonists
(Beta blockers)
β1-selective antagonists include:
Acebutolol (in hypertension, angina pectoris and arrhythmias)
Atenolol (in hypertension, coronary heart disease, arrhythmias and myocardial infarction)
Betaxolol (in hypertension and glaucoma)
Bisoprolol (in hypertension, coronary heart disease, arrhythmias, myocardial infarction and ischemic heart diseases)
Esmolol (in arrhythmias)
Metoprolol (in hypertension, coronary heart disease, myocardial infarction and heart failure)
Nebivolol (in hypertension)
Vortioxetine (antidepressant)

Mechanism in cardiac myocytes
Gs exerts its effects via two pathways. Firstly, it directly opens L-type calcium channels (LTCC) in the plasma membrane. Secondly, it renders adenylate cyclase activated, resulting in an increase of cAMP, activating protein kinase A (PKA) which in turn phosphorylates several targets, such as phospholamban, LTCC, Troponin I (TnI), and potassium channels. Phospholamban's phosphorylation deactivates its function which is normally inhibition of SERCA on the sarcoplasmic reticulum (SR) in cardiac myocytes. Due to this, more calcium enters the SR and is therefore available for the next contraction. LTCC phosphorylatation increases its open probability and therefore allows more calcium to enter the myocyte upon cell depolarisation. Both of these mechanisms increase the available calcium for contraction and therefore increase inotropy. Conversely, TnI phosphorylation results in its facilitated dissociation of calcium from troponin C (TnC) which speeds the muscle relaxation (positive lusitropy). Potassium channel phosphorylation increases its open probability which results in shorter refractory period (because the cell repolarises faster), also increasing lusitropy. Furthermore, in nodal cells such as in the SA node, cAMP directly binds to and opens the HCN channels, increasing their open probability, which increases chronotropy.

Gene
Specific polymorphisms in the ADRB1 gene have been shown to affect the resting heart rate and can be involved in heart failure.

Interactions 

Beta-1 adrenergic receptor has been shown to interact with DLG4 and GIPC1. Interaction between testosterone and β-1 ARs have been shown in anxiolytic behaviors in the basolateral amygdala.

See also 
Other adrenergic receptors
Alpha-1 adrenergic receptor
Alpha-2 adrenergic receptor
Beta-2 adrenergic receptor
Beta-3 adrenergic receptor

References

Further reading

External links 
 
 
 

Adrenergic receptors